"Those Simple Things" and "Daydream" (sometimes subtitled "What a Day for a") are songs by English pop group Right Said Fred, released as a double a-side single, and the fourth and final single from their album Up.

"Daydream" is a cover version of the song of the same name by The Lovin' Spoonful.

Track listings
United Kingdom CD (CD SNOG 4)
"Those Simple Things" (7" edit) – 3:28
"Daydream" – 3:41
"Those Simple Things" (12" mix) – 6:19
"I'm Too Sexy (Trexmix)" – 5:26

United Kingdom 12" (12 SNOG 4)
"Those Simple Things" (12" version)
"Daydream"
"Those Simple Things" (7" edit)
"I'm Too Sexy (Trexmix)"

United Kingdom 7" (SNOG 4)
"Those Simple Things"
"Daydream"

Chart history

References

1992 singles
Right Said Fred songs
Songs written by Richard Fairbrass
Songs written by Fred Fairbrass
Songs written by Rob Manzoli